England v Rest of the World was a 1963 association football match held at the Wembley Stadium in London. The Football Association invited FIFA to select a team to play England as part of the FA's celebration of the 100th anniversary of association football and was the first time a world team played against a single nation. 

For the FA's 90th anniversary celebrations, they had also played a Rest of the World team, but this was only selected from players from Europe. Jimmy Greaves was close to scoring for England several times in the first half, but failed due to laudable saves by Lev Yashin. In the second half, when Yashin was replaced by Milutin Šoškić, Greaves assisted Terry Paine to score in the 66th minute. Denis Law equalised 16 minutes later, but Greaves brought England to a last-minute victory. Greaves had the best game of his career and was considered as the best player of the match, while Yashin's saves greatly contributed to his reputation of world's best goalkeeper and earned him the Ballon d'Or two months later. 

As promised by FIFA, all of the World XI substitutes were used in the second half, with Raymond Kopa replaced by Uwe Seeler. The World XI selection committee, headed by Harry Cavan, invited Soviet-Georgian Mikheil Meskhi via the USSR Football Federation who falsely replied he was injured and couldn't play—he was not told of the invitation. Santos FC refused to release Pelé and A.C. Milan also refused to release Cesare Maldini who was replaced by Slovan Bratislava's Ján Popluhár.

Match details

References

England v Rest of the World
International association football matches
Unofficial England national football team matches
England v Rest of the World
Events at Wembley Stadium
England v Rest of the World
England v Rest of the World